Frederiksberg Hospital is a medium-sized government-owned general hospital located in Frederiksberg, Denmark. It has 380 beds (2005) and an emergency department.

The hospital is a teaching hospital for medical students from Copenhagen University.

History

The hospital was inaugurated 1903 as a replacement for the city's older hospital that had become too small.

During World War II, the German occupying power seized part of the hospital, the so-called tyske lazaret på Nyelandsvej, where a number of wounded members of the resistance died in German custody.

The hospital grew with the city until 1970 where it housed 1,000 beds. Since then, it has become more specialized and as a result, the number of beds has decreased. The hospital sorts under Region Hovedstaden since January 1, 2007. Prior to this date, the hospital was part of the formal network of hospitals in the greater Copenhagen area (Hovedstadens Sygehusfællesskab), where each hospital specializes in a number of disciplines.

Though the hospital physically hosts Psychiatric Center Frederiksberg, this center administratively sorts under the region-wide psychiatric hospital, Region Hovedstadens Psykiatri.

References

Hospital buildings completed in 1903
Hospitals in Denmark
Hospitals established in 1903
Buildings and structures in Frederiksberg Municipality
1903 establishments in Denmark